Rob Ryan was the co-owner of the Las Vegas Locomotives and a member of the Board of Directors for the now defunct United Football League.

External links
2009 UFL Media Guide

Year of birth missing (living people)
Living people
United Football League (2009–2012) owners
Las Vegas Locomotives